Micromachining may refer to:

The technique for fabrication of 3D and 2D structures on the micrometer scale.
Superfinishing, a metalworking process for producing very fine surface finishes
Various microelectromechanical systems
Bulk micromachining
Surface micromachining
High-aspect-ratio microstructure technologies

See also
High aspect ratio (HAR) silicon micromachining